Chowbus is an online food ordering, payment and delivery platform based in Chicago that was founded in 2016 by Suyu Zhang and Linxin Wen. The company links Asian restaurants to its customers in North America and Australia. At the time of its Series A round it served 20 cities with some menus in Mandarin and Cantonese. The cuisines include Chinese, Japanese, Korean, Vietnamese and Indian.

Financing
The company raised a $33 million Series A round in July 2020. In October 2020, it announced an additional $30 million investment by existing investors.

Notes

American companies established in 2016
Retail companies established in 2016
Transport companies established in 2016
Internet properties established in 2016
2016 establishments in Illinois
Companies based in Chicago
Online food retailers of the United States
Privately held companies based in Illinois
Logistics companies of the United States
Transportation companies based in Illinois